Juan Martín del Potro was the defending champion, but chose to compete in Dubai instead.
Kevin Anderson won the title after defeating Marinko Matosevic 6–4, 7–6(7–2) in the final.

Seeds

Draw

Finals

Top half

Bottom half

Qualifying

Seeds

Qualifiers

Draw

First qualifier

Second qualifier

Third qualifier

Fourth qualifier

References
 Main draw
 Qualifying draw

Delray Beach International Tennis Championships - Singles
2012 Singles
2012 Delray Beach International Tennis Championships